Richard Hobbs B.M. (ca. 1726 - 23 June 1810) was a celebrated organist in England.

He was born around 1726, the son of Thomas Hobbs (1710-1810) and Mary Matthews. Until 1753 he was organist of St Martin’s Church, Leicester when he was appointed to St Martin in the Bull Ring, Birmingham, in the place of Barnabas Gunn a position he held until 1771. He introduced Oratorio performances in Birmingham with the first taking place in the New Theatre on 10 October 1759 with a performance of William Boyce’s Solomon.

He died in Birmingham on 23 June 1810.

Appointments
Organist of St Martin’s Church, Leicester ???? - 1753
Organist of St Martin in the Bull Ring, Birmingham 1753 - 1771

References

1727 births
1810 deaths
English classical organists
British male organists
People from Birmingham, West Midlands
People from Leicester
Male classical organists